Bernhard Wachstein (31 January 1868 in Tluste, southeast Galicia – 15 January 1935 in Vienna) was a Jewish community historian and bibliographer who rebuilt, expanded, and modernized the library of the Israelitische Kultusgemeinde Wien (Vienna Israelite Community). He also performed important bibliographic work, particularly relating to the history of Austrian Jews.

Life 
After completing his Talmudic, philosophical, historical, and bibliographic studies, Bernhard Wachstein settled in Vienna and became a librarian for the Israelitische Kultusgemeinde Wien (Vienna Israelite Community).  In 1919, after the death of Bernhard Münz, he became head librarian.  

He was involved with community history and genealogy, and he made important contributions in these areas.

Selected writings
 Wiener hebräische Epitaphien, 1907
 Jüdische Privatbriefe aus dem Jahre 1619, Vienna and Leipzig 1911 (together with Alfred Landau)
 Die Gründung der Wiener Chewra Kadischa, 1911
 Katalog der Salo Cohn'schen Schenkungen, 2 volumes (Vienna: I. 1911, II. 1914)
 Die Inschriften des alten Judenfriedhofes in Wien, 2 volumes (Vienna/Leipzig: I. 1912; II. 1917)
 Hebräische Grabsteine aus dem XIII.-XV. Jahrhundert in Wien und Umgebung, Vienna 1916
 Die Grabinschriften des alten Judenfriedhofes in Eisenstadt (in: Eisenstädter Forschungen, Bd. I., published by Sandór Wolf, 1922)
 Zur Bibliographie der Gedächtnis- und Trauervorträge in der hebräischen Literatur, 3 volumes, Vienna 1922–30
 Die Juden in Eisenstadt, 2 volumes, 1926
 Beiträge zur Geschichte der Juden in Mähren (in: Juden und Judengemeinden Mährens, published by Hugo Gold, 1929)
 Die Hebräische Publizistik in Wien. In drei Teilen, Vienna 1930
 Bibliographie der Schriften Moritz Güdemanns, Vienna 1931
 Literatur über die jüdische Frau. Mit einem Anhang: Literatur über die Ehe, Vienna 1931
 Diskussionsschriften über die Judenfrage. Das neue Gesicht des Antisemitismus, Vienna 1933

Literature 
 Bibliographie der Schriften Bernhard Wachsteins, by Saul Chajes. Vienna 1933.
 Handbuch der historischen Buchbestände in Österreich, by Wilma Buchinger, Helmut W. Lang, Konstanze Mittendorfer, Österreichische Nationalbibliothek, Karen Kloth. Georg Olms Verlag, 1995
 Shoshana Duizend-Jensen: Jüdische Gemeinden, Vereine, Stiftungen und Fonds. Oldenbourg Wissenschaftsverlag, 2004.

External links 
 
 Bernhard Wachstein at JewishGen (with an image of his gravestone)
 Bust of Bernhard Wachstein at the Leo Baeck Institute
 Digitized versions of Wachstein's books at Europeana.

19th-century Austrian people
20th-century Austrian people
Austrian Jews
Austrian bibliographers
1868 births
1935 deaths
Austrian librarians